Please see talk page.
Dalkeith is an unincorporated community in Gulf County, Florida, United States.  It is located on State Road 71. Dalkeith's elevation is 20 feet.

References

Unincorporated communities in Gulf County, Florida
Unincorporated communities in Florida